Cantheleamima is a monotypic snout moth genus described by Boris Balinsky in 1994. Its only species, Cantheleamima excisa, described in the same publication, is found in South Africa and Zimbabwe.

References

Phycitinae
Monotypic moth genera
Moths of Africa
Pyralidae genera